Ledi Utomo (born 13 June 1983) is an Indonesian professional footballer who played as a defender.

Club statistics

References

External links

1983 births
Living people
Indonesian footballers
Liga 1 (Indonesia) players
Persitara Jakarta Utara players
PSMS Medan players
Indonesian Premier Division players
Persikota Tangerang players
Persita Tangerang players
Indonesia international footballers
Association football defenders
People from Tangerang
Sportspeople from Banten